The South Amboy powder pier explosion was an incident that took place on Friday, May 19, 1950. Over 420 tons of explosives in transit at the Raritan River Port in South Amboy, New Jersey detonated due to unknown causes, killing 31 and injuring over 350.

Background
The South Amboy terminal was, at the time, the only terminal of the Port of New York and New Jersey that allowed the unloading of large quantities of commercial explosives from freight cars. However, shipments over 125,000 pounds were restricted.

In 1950, the government of Pakistan contracted National Carloading Corporation to oversee the transit of 9,000 boxes of anti-personnel mines and anti-tank mines, produced by the Kilgore Manufacturing Company of Newark, Ohio and purchased by Pakistan, to Karachi. They were to arrive at South Amboy on Pennsylvania Railroad railcars, and would be loaded on the Isbrandtsen-owned steamship Flying Clipper bound for Karachi. This shipment was later joined by 1,800 boxes of gelignite, produced by Hercules Powder Co., destined for commercial sale in Afghanistan. The combined shipment weighed a total of 300,000 pounds, and James Healing Co., the company hired by National Carloading Corporation for lightering, sought permissions from the United States Coast Guard to temporarily lift the 125,000 pounds restriction. On May 18, they received written and verbal permission from the Coast Guard.

By May 19, the shipments had arrived at the port via railcars, and were being loaded onto four barges at pier 4, the "explosive anchorage" or "powder pier", of Pennsylvania Railroad, located at the foot of Augusta Street.

Explosion
At approximately 7:26 pm EDT, while being transferred on the barges, 150 tons of the explosives detonated, triggering a chain reaction that caused the explosion of a total of over 420 tons of explosives.

At 7:50 pm, South Amboy mayor John Leonard declared a state of emergency in South Amboy. He requested help from Governor of New Jersey Alfred E. Driscoll, who sent New Jersey State Police and military assistance. Red Cross disaster units, fire departments, first aid squads and volunteers from neighboring towns joined the rescue effort. 

26 employees of the lighterage company and 5 coal barge captains were killed in the explosion, leading to a total casualty count of 31. Only 5 bodies were identified, and many of the bodies were never recovered. Over 350 were injured. The explosion destroyed the four barges, the railcars, the powder pier and adjacent piers. At least 17 other barges in the pier were set on fire or sunk. Almost all of South Amboy's 2,700 homes and buildings suffered some degree of damage. The power grid of the city was also destroyed, causing a blackout. Total property damage was estimated to be over $10 million.

Legacy
In 1953, the United States Army performed a three-day search of the area, removing 62 live mines dispersed by the explosion in the harbor area.

Kilgore Manufacturing Company became the target of a congressional investigation, and was charged with 9,000 counts of munitions violations. The hearings revealed that the company had packed detonating fuses in the same case as the explosives, violating regulations set out by the Interstate Commerce Commission. The decision of the Coast Guard to temporarily lift restrictions were also criticized in the hearings, by Mayor Leonard and former Governor Harold G. Hoffman.

In 2013, a plaque was installed at the site to commemorate the disaster.

See also
 T. A. Gillespie Company Shell Loading Plant explosion, a 1918 munitions explosion in New Jersey
 List of accidents and incidents involving transport or storage of ammunition

Notes

References

Industrial fires and explosions in the United States
May 1950 events in the United States
Explosions in 1950
Explosions in New Jersey
1950 in New Jersey
South Amboy, New Jersey